B71, B-71 or B 71 may refer to:
 Bundesstraße 71, a German road
 B71 Sandoy, a football team in the Faroe Islands
 Lockheed SR-71 Blackbird, an American airplane
 Sicilian Defense, Dragon Variation, according to the Encyclopaedia of Chess Openings 
 West Bromwich, according to the list of postal districts in the United Kingdom
 HLA-B71, an HLA-B serotype
 Tupolev SB-2, soviet bomber in licence production in Czechoslovakia was called B-71
 Radar Station B-71, a US Army Air Force early warning station in World War II